Frederick Joseph Ryan Jr. (born April 12, 1955) is an American media proprietor, political adviser, and lawyer who serves as the publisher and chief executive officer of The Washington Post. He was the president and chief operating officer of Allbritton Communications Company and founding chief executive officer and president of Politico. He was the chief of staff for former President Ronald Reagan from 1989 to 1995, and is chairman of the board of trustees of the Ronald Reagan Presidential Foundation.

Early life 
Ryan was born on April 12, 1955, in Tampa, Florida.

Education 
In 1977, Ryan graduated magna cum laude with a Bachelor's Degree from University of Southern California. In 1980, Ryan graduated with honors from USC Law School.

In 2019, before delivering the commencement address, Ryan received an honorary doctorate degree from Wake Forest University.

Career

Attorney 
Ryan was employed as an attorney in the Los Angeles, California law firm of Hill, Farrer and Burrill before joining the successful 1980 Reagan-Bush presidential campaign.

White House years
Ryan began serving at the White House in February 1982 during the Reagan administration as Deputy Director of Presidential Appointments and Scheduling. He was appointed a year later to the position of Director of Presidential Appointments and Scheduling. In 1985, Ryan was appointed by the President to head the White House Office of Private Sector Initiatives, as well as maintaining his employment as Director of Scheduling.

On November 4, 1987, President Reagan personally appointed Ryan to be Assistant to the President, the highest level of staff position in the White House.

When President Reagan left office on January 20, 1989, he and First Lady Nancy Reagan returned to California. Ryan was hired to be the former President's post-Chief of Staff. During this time, Ryan was responsible for the establishment and operation of Reagan's office in Century City. He was also instrumental in the design, fundraising, planning, and overseeing the construction of the Ronald Reagan Presidential Library.

Ryan left his position as Chief of Staff in 1995. A year earlier, President Reagan had announced to the world that he had been diagnosed with Alzheimer's disease.

Media career
Following his service as Chief of Staff to former President Reagan, Ryan became vice-chairman of the television, cable, and internet company Allbritton Communications. As President and COO of the company, he managed its multiple broadcast and cable properties.

In 2007, Ryan co-founded Politico, a politically focused website and newspaper. Under his leadership as president and CEO, Politico was recognized by Fast Company Magazine for Excellence as one of the "World's Most Innovative Companies" in March 2010. In the May 2013 issue of Washington Life, the impact of Politico was noted with Ryan's inclusion in the "Power 100" list of the One Hundred Most Influential People in Washington. The success of their cross-platform coverage of political news won the "Walter Cronkite Award" in 2013 for Politico, ABC-7, and NewsChannel 8 under Ryan's management.

In September 2014, Jeff Bezos, owner of The Washington Post, named Ryan Publisher and CEO, signaling a new digitally-focused direction for the publication. On December 14, 2022 Ryan announced massive layoffs at the Washington Post during a Washington Post town hall meeting.

Reagan Foundation
In 1995, Ryan became the chairman of the board of trustees for the Ronald Reagan Presidential Foundation, serving with fellow board members including First Lady Nancy Reagan and former New York City Mayor Rudy Giuliani. He manages the foundation and takes part in library events, with a mission of "preserving Ronald Reagan's legacy."

Under Ryan's chairmanship, the Reagan Foundation garnered the "crown jewel" of President artifacts by obtaining Air Force One, the Presidential Aircraft that had flown Reagan and six other Presidents of the United States. Through funds contributed by his friend T. Boone Pickens and other donors, the Air Force One Museum was built at the Reagan Presidential Library in Simi Valley, CA.

Ryan made a personal contribution of his own to the Reagan Presidential Library by purchasing the Ronald Reagan Pub in County Tipperary, Ireland while visiting it on a family vacation in 2004. The working pub was completely disassembled and transported by container ship to Los Angeles where it was reassembled under the wing of Air Force One at the Reagan Presidential Library. Ryan's friend, Presidential journalist, Hugh Sidey, joined in for the formal dedication of the Ronald Reagan Pub at the Library. In making the gift, Ryan expressed his pride in his Irish heritage which may account for the reason he and his wife host a large St. Patrick's Day party at their Potomac, MD home each year.

Ryan headed the team that organized the moving national tribute and funeral for Ronald Reagan in June 2004. He was a Pall Bearer at President Reagan's request.

Ryan headed the year-long celebration of Ronald Reagan's 100th Birthday in 2011. President Obama appointed him to the bipartisan Ronald Reagan Centennial Commission created by an act of Congress. Ryan was elected Chairman of the commission by the United States Senators and Members of Congress that served on the commission with him. Events were held across the country and in major European Capitals celebrating the impact of Reagan policies in promoting freedom and democracy.

In the years following the Reagan Administration, Ryan was very close to Nancy Reagan and is said to have advised her on important matters. In May 2013, he was Nancy Reagan's personal representative at the official funeral service for former Prime Minister Margaret Thatcher in London.

White House Historical Association 
Ryan has served as a Director of the White House Historical Association since 2001. In 2012, Ryan became the Chairman of White House Historical Association.

As part of the "Campaign for White House History", Ryan works with First Lady Michelle Obama, Caroline Kennedy and former First Family members of both political parties to provide funding for educational and preservation projects for the White House.

David M. Rubenstein, former White House aide and philanthropist, supported this effort through a $10 million gift to create the David M. Rubenstein National Center for White House History. Another major project of the fundraising campaign is the new White House Visitors Center.

Other activities 
While working in the Reagan White House, Ryan was introduced to Prince Charles, the Prince of Wales. This led to a joint meeting of British and American Business Leaders that encouraged corporate social responsibility and support of private sector initiatives. Over the years since then, Ryan has served as a Patron of the Prince of Wales Foundation and as a member of the Board of Director of Duchy USA, the Prince's corporate initiative in the United States.

Ryan serves as co-chairman of the Advisory Committee on Presidential Libraries, a nonpartisan group formed by the Archivist of the United States. He is a member of the advisory board for the National Museum of American History, the Board of Councilors for the Annenberg School for Communication & Journalism at USC and the Ford's Theatre Board of Trustees.

A program obtained from the elite Alfalfa Club Dinner in January 2014 indicated that Ryan is the Secretary of that secretive organization.

Ryan is the editor of Ronald Reagan: The Wisdom and Humor of the Great Communicator, published by HarperCollins in 1995, and Ronald Reagan: The Great Communicator, published by HarperCollins in 2001. He was also Executive Producer of the highly acclaimed video of the Reagan Presidency, entitled The Reagan Years.

References

External links

1955 births
Living people
Reagan administration personnel
American political consultants
United States presidential advisors
University of Southern California alumni
Assistants to the President of the United States
USC Gould School of Law alumni
American chief executives
American chief operating officers
Politico people